The Nissan CD engine is a diesel version of the Nissan CA engine that replaced the Nissan LD four-cylinder engine. They have a cast-iron block and alloy head. It was used from 1980 to the late 1990s until it was replaced by the Nissan YD engine.

CD17
, bore and stroke . Built to be as light as possible, the engine walls were made thinner by the use of fins where extra strength was needed, while lateral ribs helped reduce vibration and noise. A new, two-stage glowplug meant that even cold starting times were rarely more than a few seconds.

CD17 (early)
 at 5000 rpm at 2800 rpm

 1982–1985 Nissan Sunny B11
 1983–1986 Nissan Pulsar/Cherry N12
 1983–1986 Nissan Langley N12
 1983–1986 Nissan Laurel Spirit B11
 1982–1990 Nissan AD VB11

CD17 (late)
 at 5000 rpm at 2800 rpm
 1982–1985 Nissan Sentra B11
 1985–1995 Nissan Sunny B12-B13
 1986–1995 Nissan Pulsar N13-N14
 1986–1990 Nissan Langley N13
 1986–1990 Nissan Laurel Spirit B12
 1990–1998 Nissan AD Y10

CD17T
 turbocharged

 DIN

 1984–198? Nissan Stanza T11 (Belgium, possibly other markets)

CD20

 at 4800 rpm at 2800 rpm

Nissan Serena C23 1991–1993
Nissan Avenir Cargo VSW10 1990–1998
Nissan Sunny B14 1994–1998
Nissan Pulsar N15 1995–1999
Nissan Wingroad Y10 1996–1999
Nissan Almera N15 1995–2000
Nissan Primera P10 1992–1995
Nissan AD Y10 1997–1999

CD20E
Electronically Controlled
 at 4800 rpm at 2800 rpm

Nissan Bluebird U14 1998–2001

CD20T
turbocharged
 at 4400 rpm at 2400 rpm

Nissan Avenir W10 1993–1998
Nissan Serena C23 1991–1996
Nissan Primera P11E 1996–2002

CD20Ti
turbocharged and intercooled
 at 4000 rpm at 2400 rpm

Nissan Largo W30 1993–1995

CD20ET1
electronically controlled and turbocharged
 at 4000 rpm at 2400 rpm

Nissan Serena C23 1997–1999

CD20ET2
electronically controlled and turbocharged
 at 4400 rpm at 2400 rpm

Nissan Avenir W11 1998–2000

CD20ETi
electronically controlled and turbocharged with intercooler
 at 4000 rpm at 2000 rpm

Nissan Largo W30 1995–1999

See also
List of Nissan engines

References

CD
Diesel engines by model
Straight-four engines